Tariqe Kumahl Malachi Akwesi Fosu (born 5 November 1995), sometimes known as Tariqe Fosu-Henry, is a professional footballer who plays as a left winger for  club Rotherham United, on loan from  club Brentford. He represents the Ghana national team at international level.

A product of the Reading academy, Fosu rose to prominence at Charlton Athletic and Oxford United, before transferring to Brentford in January 2020. Fosu was capped by England at U18 level and made his senior international debut for Ghana in October 2020.

Club career

Reading
A left winger or attacking midfielder, Fosu began his career in the Reading academy at the age of 9 in 2004 and progressed to be awarded a scholarship at the end of the 2011–12 season. He was involved in numerous successes with the Royals' U18 and U21 teams and signed a professional contract during the 2013–14 season. Fosu was named in the first team squad on three occasions during the 2014–15 season and made his debut on the final day, as a substitute for Jack Stacey after 30 minutes of a 3–0 victory over Derby County.

Fosu signed a new two-year contract on 26 June 2015, but spent much of his subsequent Reading career with the U21 team or away on loan. He moved to League One club Fleetwood Town on loan until 2 January 2016. He made 7 appearances and scored his first senior goal during his spell, which came in a 5–1 victory over Swindon Town on 21 November. Fosu's November 2015 performances saw him long-listed for the PFA Fans' League One Player of the Month award. On 24 March 2016, Fosu joined promotion-chasing League Two club Accrington Stanley on loan until the end of the 2015–16 season. He made 8 appearances, scored three goals and was part of the team that was defeated by AFC Wimbledon in the League Two play-off semi-finals. Fosu's performances during April 2016 won him the League Two Player of the Month award.

On 31 August 2016, Fosu joined League One Colchester United on a half-season loan, which was subsequently extended until the end of the 2016–17 season. He made 34 appearances and scored six goals for the club. At the end of the 2016–17 season, Fosu turned down a new contract and transferred away from the Madejski Stadium.

Charlton Athletic
On 19 June 2017, Fosu joined League One club Charlton Athletic for an undisclosed nominal fee and signed a two-year contract, effective 1 July 2017. He had two successful seasons with the Addicks, scoring a perfect hat-trick (right foot, left foot and head) against former club Fleetwood Town on 30 September 2017, finishing the 2017–18 season as the club's second-leading scorer and helping the club to two play-off finishes, though he missed the successful 2019 play-off campaign due to a hamstring injury. Fosu turned down a new contract and departed the club when it expired at the end of the 2018–19 season. During two seasons at The Valley, Fosu made 65 appearances and scored 11 goals.

Oxford United 
On 1 July 2019, Fosu reunited with his former Charlton Athletic manager Karl Robinson at League One club Oxford United and signed a three-year contract for an undisclosed fee. During the first half of the 2019–20 season, he scored 10 goals in 33 appearances and won the October 2019 PFA Fans' League One Player of the Month award. Fosu transferred away from the Kassam Stadium on the final day of the January 2020 transfer window.

Brentford

2020–2021 
On 31 January 2020, Fosu transferred to Championship club Brentford, after the £750,000 release clause in his Oxford United contract was activated. He signed a -year contract and made 11 appearances and scored one goal during the remainder of the 2019–20 season, which ended with defeat in the 2020 Championship play-off Final.

Fosu began the 2020–21 season predominantly as a substitute in league matches, before breaking into the starting lineup in late-November 2020. He scored his first goal of the season with the winner in a 2–1 victory over Bournemouth on 30 December. Fosu's performances and two goals in three league matches in January 2021 saw him nominated for the PFA Fans' Championship Player of the Month award. He finished Brentford's 2021 Championship play-off Final-winning 2020–21 season with 49 appearances and four goals.

2021–22 
Despite featuring in all but one of Brentford's 2021–22 pre-season friendlies. a move away on loan for Fosu fell through late in the summer transfer window. Despite being named in the club's 25-man Premier League squad for the first half of the regular season, he was largely frozen out of the matchday squads in all competitions. Prior to undergoing surgery on a hamstring injury suffered during training in November 2021, Fosu had been restricted to two EFL Cup appearances. Fosu returned to training in mid-January 2022 and after a loan move failed to materialise during the winter transfer window, he remained part of the club's 25-man Premier League squad during the second half of the 2021–22 season. On 20 March, Fosu was named in a Premier League squad for only the second time in the season and made his first league appearance for 10 months as a substitute for Rico Henry after 74 minutes of a 2–1 defeat to Leicester City. He remained an unused substitute during six further league matches and did not appear again before the end of the 2021–22 season.

2022–23 
Ahead of the 2022–23 season, Fosu was not called into Brentford's pre-season training camp in Germany and only appeared in two B team friendlies. He was not issued a squad number and entering the final year of his contract, he joined Championship club Stoke City on a season-long loan on 16 August 2022. Fosu immediately assumed a starting role and his October 2022 performances were recognised with the club's Player of the Month award. He made 20 appearances prior to being dropped to the bench at the turn of the year. On 20 January 2023, Fosu was recalled from the loan and immediately sent to Championship club Rotherham United on loan until the end of the 2022–23 season.

International career 
Fosu was capped by England at U18 level. He was called up to the Ghana squad for two 2021 Africa Cup of Nations qualifiers in March 2020, which were later postponed. Fosu made his first appearances for the team with starts in friendlies versus Mali and Qatar in October 2020 and he scored his first international goal in the latter match, with the opener in a 5–1 victory. Following appearances in a pair of 2021 Africa Cup of Nations qualifiers versus Sudan in November 2020, Fosu was removed from a training camp prior to a pair of friendly matches in June 2021.

Style of play 
An attacking player, Fosu has been described as "most comfortable on the left side of a three, he isn't a flying winger, but one who can call upon quick feet and an eye for goal to hurt the opposition. More likely to cut in from wide and shoot rather than get a ball in from the byline". Following his deployment as a right back for Ghana in October 2020, he gained further experience in the same position with Brentford during the 2020–21 season.

Personal life
Fosu is of Ghanaian descent.

Career statistics

Club

International 

Scores and results list Ghana's goal tally first, score column indicates score after each Fosu goal.

Honours
Reading
U21 Premier League Cup: 2013–14

Charlton Athletic
EFL League One play-offs: 2019

Brentford
EFL Championship play-offs: 2021

Individual
Football League Two Player of the Month: April 2016
Oxford United Player of the Month: September 2019, October 2019
PFA Fans' League One Player of the Month: October 2019
Stoke City Player of the Month: October 2022

References

External links

Tariqe Fosu at brentfordfc.com
Tariqe Fosu at readingfc.co.uk

1995 births
Living people
Footballers from Wandsworth
English footballers
England youth international footballers
Citizens of Ghana through descent
Ghanaian footballers
Ghana international footballers
Association football midfielders
Reading F.C. players
Fleetwood Town F.C. players
Accrington Stanley F.C. players
Colchester United F.C. players
Charlton Athletic F.C. players
Oxford United F.C. players
Brentford F.C. players
Stoke City F.C. players
Rotherham United F.C. players
English Football League players
English sportspeople of Ghanaian descent
Premier League players